Daniel J. Knuth (July 3, 1945 – October 5, 2020) was an American politician, educator, and environmental consultant.

Early life and education 
Knuth was born in Mabel, Minnesota and graduated from Mabel High School. He received his bachelor's degree in physical geography from Minnesota State University, Mankato and his master's and doctorate degrees in physical geography from Indiana University.

Career 
He worked as a hydrologist, as an environmental consultant and taught at Macalester College. Knuth served in the Minnesota House of Representatives from 1985 to 1988 and was a Democrat. Knuth lived in New Brighton, Minnesota with his wife and family. His daughter Kate Knuth and his brother-in-law Gordon Backlund also served in the Minnesota Legislature.

Death 
Knuth died from Alzheimer's disease in New Brighton, Minnesota.

Notes

1945 births
2020 deaths
People from Mabel, Minnesota
People from New Brighton, Minnesota
Indiana University alumni
Minnesota State University, Mankato alumni
Macalester College faculty
American environmentalists
Democratic Party members of the Minnesota House of Representatives
Neurological disease deaths in Minnesota
Deaths from Alzheimer's disease